Cheech & Chong's The Corsican Brothers is an American film released in 1984, the sixth feature-length film starring the comedy duo Cheech and Chong. Cheech Marin and Tommy Chong star as the two twin brothers in a parody of various film adaptations of the 1844 Alexandre Dumas novella, The Corsican Brothers.

To date, it is the last live-action film starring the duo, and the only one that does not heavily revolve around the normal elements of stoner comedy (being that there are very few references to marijuana). Instead the film elects to be a straightforward farce of swashbuckler films.

Plot

Los Guys, a rockabilly band, has developed a racket playing loud music on the streets of France and accepting payment for them to stop playing.  While at a nearby restaurant counting the proceeds from their latest "gig," two lead band members meet a gypsy storyteller. She tells them the story of The Corsican Brothers.

The story begins with the birth of two superfecund twin brothers, Louis and Lucien (played by adult Cheech and Chong as babies, children and adults), each by a different aristocratic French father; the two fathers end up dead in a botched duel over their partner's infidelity, with the twins raised as orphans. At age nine, their trait of feeling pain from the other's injuries becomes apparent (it becomes the film's predominant running gag); they accidentally burn down their house while playing with this power, and they decide to split up.

At age 30, they reunite: Louis (now Luís) wound up in Mexico working low-end jobs (though he claims to be a wealthy businessman) and Lucien, who stayed in France, has grown resentful of the royals' harsh treatment of peasants in the country, particularly that of the queen's regent, the sadistic (in more ways than one) Fuckaire, who usurped the king after his disappearance. The cowardly Luís is reluctant to help his brother's revolutionary plans, but both find themselves drawn to two of the queen's daughters (played by Cheech and Chong's real-life wives). The crux of Lucien's scheme is to disguise themselves respectively as a gay Spaniard hairdresser and Nostradamus, who are prepared to visit the queen with the Marquis du Hickey. Despite a setback in which they are temporarily imprisoned because Lucien would rather fight outnumbered than flee from danger as Luís wanted, Lucien manages to escape. At Luís's execution, Lucien and the peasants storm the festivities, Luís is freed and Fuckaire is deposed. As Luís prepares for the dual wedding between the brothers and princesses, he suddenly fears for their future, and Lucien sweeps in to rescue him as they both leave the princesses at the altar, resolved to cross the globe and start a revolution in America.

After their saga concludes, Los Guys resume playing in an outdoor cafe, covering Chuck Berry's "Nadine," to an indifferent audience.

Much of the film's humor comes from anachronisms: The Corsican Brothers is set in the 1840s (in the film it is portrayed closer to 18th-century, pre-revolution France), but Nostradamus, who lived and died three centuries prior, makes an appearance, and Luís is said to have spent time in a modern-day Mexico.

Cast
Cheech Marin as Luis Corsican
Tommy Chong as Lucian Corsican
Roy Dotrice as The Evil Fuckaire/Ye Old Jailer
Shelby Chong as Princess I
Rikki Marin (Cheech's real-life wife) as Princess II
Edie McClurg as The Queen
Robbi Chong as Princess III
Jean-Claude Dreyfus as Marquis Du Hickey
Rae Dawn Chong as The Gypsy
Kay Dotrice as The Midwife
Jennie C. Kos as The Pregnant Mother
Martin Pepper as Martin
Yvan Chiffre as Tax Collector #1
Dan Schwarz as Tax Collector #2
Serge Fedoroff as Nostrodamus
Pierre Olaf as Courtier

Reception
Leonard Maltin said the film was "Staggeringly unfunny even by C&C standards; the previews for Start the Revolution Without Me have more laughs."

References

External links

 
 

1984 films
Cheech & Chong (film series)
Films based on The Corsican Brothers
Orion Pictures films
American comedy films
1984 comedy films
Films set in France
Films scored by George S. Clinton
Films directed by Tommy Chong
Films produced by Peter MacGregor-Scott
1980s English-language films
1980s American films